PMAG can refer to:
 Presidential Management Alumni Group, non-profit organization
 Provisional Military Advisory Group, original name of the Korean Military Advisory Group
 A line of polymer rifle magazines manufactured by Magpul Industries